The Battle of Lugos was fought on 21 September 1695 near the city of Lugos in the East Banat, between the forces of the Ottoman Empire, and the forces of the Habsburg monarchy as part of the Great Turkish War.

Background

By 1695 the Ottoman Empire had retaken the offensive. Sultan Mustafa II ordered the renewal of the attack in Transylvania and his army captured Lipova shortly after. Defending the Banat region and encamped close to Lipova was the Austrian field marshal, Johann Friedrich Ambrosius von Veterani (in Italian, Federico Ambrosio Veterani, who was born in Urbino), commander in chief of the Transylvanian forces, with an army of 7,000 men.

Battle
The Ottomans advanced from Lipova and clashed with the Christian army; General Veterani was unable to form a junction with the Imperial Army under Elector of Saxony Augustus II the Strong. The battle caused heavy casualties on both sides. Field Marshal Veterani was taken prisoner by the Turks and beheaded. Captain Strahinja and Antonije Znorić, commanders of the units of Serbian Militia within Austrian army, were also killed in this battle.

Aftermath
The Great Turkish War continued until the replacement of Augustus by Eugene of Savoy as commander in chief and as a consequence the Ottoman Empire's ultimate defeat two years later at Zenta.

References 

Battles of the Great Turkish War
Battles involving the Ottoman Empire
Battles involving the Holy Roman Empire
Conflicts in 1695
17th century in Hungary
1695 in the Habsburg monarchy
1695 in the Ottoman Empire
Battles involving Serbian Militia